Crabbie's is a Scottish brand traditionally known for its green ginger wine and blended whiskies produced at John Crabbie & Co's extensive premises in the Leith area of Edinburgh, Scotland. That company has changed its name and its business is unrelated to the original. The brands were bought by Halewood International Ltd and are presently best known for ginger beers manufactured at Halewood's plant in Liverpool. John Crabbie & Company (Wines) Limited was incorporated in May 2006 and changed its name to John Crabbie & Company Limited the following July.

Background
Crabbie's traces its founding to 1801 when Miller Crabbie was a merchant in Edinburgh. The business was inherited by his son John Crabbie (1806 – 1891) who went on to found John Crabbie & Co.

In the mid-19th century, John Crabbie acquired a former porter brewery located between Yardheads and Great Junction Street in Edinburgh's port of Leith. Over the ensuing years the premises were extended mainly to provide bonded warehouses for Crabbie's whisky business. The company was also engaged in gin rectifying and the production of fruit-based cordials. Of these, Crabbie's was best known for its green ginger wine which was continued to be made in Leith until the 1980s when John Crabbie & Co was acquired by another Leith distiller and blender, Macdonald & Muir, and production of green ginger wine was transferred to Broxburn, West Lothian. Macdonald & Muir had acquired the Glenmorangie Distillery in 1918 and renamed itself The Glenmorangie Company in 1996. In 2007, it sold the brand to the present owners, Halewood International. Preserving its links with Leith, John Crabbie & Company Limited is in the present day a dormant company with a company address in Mitchell Street, Leith. However, production of Crabbie's ginger beer takes place in Liverpool, England.

Distribution

Since 2011 Crabbie's has been distributed in Australia through Woolworths Liquor, Beer Wine Spirits and Dan Murphy's grocery stores. In 2012, Crabbie's began distribution in the United States through St. Killian company

Variations
In the UK, Crabbie's is available in flavours such as Original, Scottish Raspberry, IPA and Stout, with a Spiced Orange variant also available in the United States. Outside of the UK and the United States, other variations might be found in speciality shops.

In the UK, it is a gluten free product. in May 2019 Crabbie's changed their Ginger Beer recipe to contain 5% actual beer so it now contains wheat and barley, but still maintains its Gluten Free label as the new gluten containing ingredients have a gluten level of less than 20 ppm. The product is no longer suitable for anyone with a wheat or barley intolerance.

In the United States, Crabbie's is sold as a malt beverage and is not gluten free. The discovery that the American version of Crabbie's is not gluten free caused much alarm and controversy among the celiac and gluten intolerant community, as Crabbie's was originally marketed as gluten free in the United States.

Sponsorship

Crabbie's is a sponsor of both international and grassroots rugby, with sponsorships of Wales & Scotland, and Rugby Union clubs Ospreys, Newport Dragons, Scarlets, Cardiff Blues, Edinburgh Rugby, Glasgow Warriors, Newcastle Falcons, Northampton Saints, Yorkshire Carnegie, Richmond, Esher, Caldy, Southport and Rugby League club St Helens.

Crabbies are the headline sponsor for Bournemouth 7s Festival who are the World's Largest Sports and Music Festival taking place with over 400 teams in the last Bank Holiday weekend in May.

Crabbie's was the official sponsor of the Grand National Festival from 2013-2016.

Scottish football club Hibernian has also been sponsored by Crabbie's.

References

External links
 UK Website
 US website

Ginger
Drink companies of Scotland
Scottish brands